Episcopa Theodora is the Greek inscription on a 9th-century Christian mosaic in the Chapel of Bishop Zeno of Verona located within the Church of Saint Praxedis the Martyr in Rome.  

The honorific title refers to the Lady Theodora, the historical mother of Pope Paschal I, who built the chapel for her while she was still alive, as indicated by the square halo of the mosaic. Theodora was widely known to be a devout Christian in the early Church, and was notable for her acts of piety and sanctity.

Theodora as bishop
The lettering "EPISCOPA" has been interpreted by some to mean "bishop" and therefore that Theodora was a bishop. Some Catholic theologians and Roman art scholars take issue with this argument by pointing out that feminizations of clerical titles have traditionally been associated with the wives and widows of early Christian clergy since the Apostolic Age.

Since married bishops were more common in late antiquity and the early middle ages than in later centuries (priestly celibacy was only enforced in the Catholic Church after the Great Schism of 1054), the title Episcopa may refer to the wife or widow of a bishop, as well as the mother of any bishop, such as that of Pope Paschal I. Therefore, the title Episcopa is said to have been used for the Lady Theodora for her esteemed position as the mother of the Pope as well as her own piety; a holy woman who practiced great austerity and religiosity, and not as an ordained bishop.

Epigraphy

An extant dedicatory marble inscription in the basilica identifies Theodora as the mother of Pope Paschal.  

The dedication, which includes the description of the transfer of the relics of Saint Zeno after whom the chapel containing the image is named, has the following inscription:

See also
 Diakonissa
 Presbytera

References

Mosaics
Ordination of women in Christianity
Ordination of women and the Catholic Church
Christian iconography
9th-century Italian women